Sandro Barbosa do Nascimento (7 July 1978 – 12 June 2000) was the perpetrator of the Bus 174 hostage crisis in Jardim Botânico, Rio de Janeiro, Brazil. Nascimento boarded a public bus, intending to rob the passengers.  However, the incident developed into a hostage situation, which was broadcast live by most Brazilian national television channels.

Early life
According to Nascimento's relatives, he witnessed the murder of his mother. Shortly after the incident, Nascimento ran away from his home to become a vagabond on the streets.

At one point, Nascimento resided in the area of Candelaria, a historical church in Rio de Janeiro, where he witnessed the Candelaria church massacre, in which Brazilian police killed eight adolescents and injured several others, on 23 July 1993. Nascimento was unharmed, and cited the event as a reason for perpetrating his hostage situation.

Bus 174 hostage situation
On Pentecost Monday, 12 June 2000, Nascimento boarded a public bus (Ônibus #174) in Jardim Botânico, Rio de Janeiro. He was armed with a .38 caliber revolver, with the intention to rob the passengers. Moments after Nascimento announced the robbery, a passenger signaled to a vehicle from the Rio de Janeiro military police, prompting the police to intercept the bus.

Nascimento then took the passengers of the bus hostage. The bus was soon surrounded by police officers, television news crews, and civilian onlookers. At first, Nascimento assured everybody that he did not intend to kill anyone. Nascimento demanded weapons and a new bus driver (since the original driver had escaped through a window) to aid in his escape from the scene. As his demands went on ungranted, he threatened to kill a hostage at 6:00 PM (21:00 GMT).

Nascimento singled out several of the hostages for dramatic demonstrations over the course of the event, repeatedly using them as human shields. Near 7:00 PM (22:00 GMT), Nascimento fired his revolver, bluffing the execution of hostage Janaína Lopes Neves to those outside the bus. The other hostages were told to act as if the execution had occurred.

Shortly afterwards, at 6:50 PM (21:50 GMT) local time, Nascimento exited the bus, using schoolteacher Geisa Firmo Gonçalves as a human shield. As Nascimento's attention was being held in one direction, an officer armed with a submachine gun approached him from behind. Just prior to the officer reaching him, Nascimento turned directly toward the officer and reacted by jerking away from the officer, falling to the ground, taking Gonçalves with him. The officer reacted by continuing his advance and firing two or three shots at Nascimento while doing so. The first shot struck Gonçalves in the face; none of the other shots hit either person. Nascimento then proceeded to fire three shots at Gonçalves, killing her. Officers then converged on Nascimento and Gonçalves as they lay on the ground. Surrounding crowds rushed the area. Nascimento was immobilised by the police and taken into custody.

Nascimento was still alive by the time he was placed into a police vehicle, but some time after being taken into custody, he died of asphyxiation. There were later assertions that Nascimento was intentionally killed by the police, and that his death was revenge for the public nature of the hostage event. The officers who took him into custody were charged with murder; after the jury trial, they were found not guilty.

Gonçalves had been shot four times; police reports concluded she had been shot once in the face by the advancing police officer and then three times in the back by Nascimento in the ensuing struggle. The officer's shot was ruled unintentional by a court.

The bus route
The number "174" was used to identify a specific bus route between Central do Brasil and Gávea. Due to the stigma caused by this incident, the route was rebadged as "158" in November 2001, then to "143", and in February 2016 for "Troncal 5".

Films
At least two films have been made depicting the events of the hostage crisis.

Bus 174 (2002) retells the incident, discussing the life of Nascimento, and speculates on the social factors that led him to actions. The film contains a large amount of original video footage of the event, and recounts from several people surrounding the event, including the hostages, family of Nascimento, police officials, and news reporters.

Última Parada 174 (2008) relates a fictionalized account of the life of Nascimento, street kid in Rio de Janeiro that survived the Candelaria massacre, and in 2000, hijacked a bus. On September 16, 2008 the film was chosen by the Ministry of Culture as the representative of Brazil in the Oscar competition for best foreign film at the ceremony in 2009.

See also
 List of hostage crises
 Manila hostage crisis – a similar incident where a gunman took a bus hostage, and the crisis was broadcast on live TV.

References

Do Nascimento
Do Nascimento
Do Nascimento
Deaths in police custody in Brazil
Street children
Deaths from asphyxiation